Mele is a village immediately southeast of Gornja Radgona in northeastern Slovenia.

There is a small chapel-shrine in the settlement. It was built in the early 19th century. It has a pair of Tuscan columns on the front corners holding a pediment, painted at a later date when it was remodelled in a Neo-Gothic style with pointed windows and a small belfry on its steep roof.

References

External links
Mele on Geopedia

Populated places in the Municipality of Gornja Radgona